WLOP (1370 AM) is a radio station broadcasting a sports format. Licensed to Jesup, Georgia, United States, the station is currently owned by Jesup Broadcasting Corp. and features programming from Fox Sports Radio.

References

External links

LOP
Fox Sports Radio stations